Defending champion Stéphane Houdet and his partner Joachim Gérard defeated Gustavo Fernández and Nicolas Peifer in the final, 4–6, 6–3, [11–9] to win the men's doubles wheelchair tennis title at the 2014 French Open. It was Houdet's second step towards a Grand Slam.

Houdet and Shingo Kunieda were the defending champions, but did not play together. Kunieda partnered Takuya Miki, but was defeated by Gérard and Houdet in the semifinals.

Seeds
 Joachim Gérard /  Stéphane Houdet (champions)
 Gordon Reid /  Maikel Scheffers (semifinals)

Draw

Finals

References
 Draw

Wheelchair Men's Doubles
French Open, 2014 Men's Doubles